Crispino Agostinucci (1882–1969) was an Italian military figure and a major-general in the Italian army.
Agostinucci served as Chief of Staff Royal Carabinieri from 1931 to 1935, as General Officer Commanding Royal Carabinieri Albania
from 1940 to 1941 as Deputy Commander in Chief Royal Carabinieri from 1940 to 1942, and as president of the National Association of Carabinieri from 1947 until his retirement in 1961.

References

1882 births
1969 deaths
Italian generals
20th-century Italian military personnel
Italian military personnel of World War II
Carabinieri